Common Chinese-language deviations by foreign-influenced speakers or learners of Chinese (sometimes called Westernised Chinese), usually refers to a pattern of written or spoken Chinese, characterised by significant influence from Western languages, with particular regards to grammar, vocabulary and syntax. Influences from English are particularly noticeable, especially in translations of literary works and documents. Westernised Chinese may lack certain characteristics of more traditional writing styles, and thus may at times pose reading or comprehension issues for readers unfamiliar with this style. It is probable that most Westernized-Chinese translations are direct glosses from English into Chinese by native Chinese-speakers, given the virtually non-existent demand for native English-speakers to perform written translation into Chinese.  In the first half of the 20th century, Lu Xun advocated that translations of Western works into Chinese closely follow Westernised structures. Lu Xun's arguments failed to be persuasive across the board and many translators subsequently followed more naturalizing translation styles from English to Chinese.

In Taiwan, Westernised Chinese includes many direct influences from the Japanese language, a popular feature being sentence lengthening.  In Japanese and many other languages, longer sentences relate to greater politeness and this has had a direct effect on speech patterns in Taiwan. The Taiwanese restaurant industry has especially been heavily influenced by its Japanese counterparts, and a more demanding 'service attitude' has deepened the public connection between long sentences and politeness.

Examples
 Abstract nouns as subject. e.g.:
 "The decline in his income has led to changes in his lifestyle."
 "他的收入的减少改变了他的生活方式。" (他的收入的減少改變了他的生活方式。)
 (he NOM income NOM decline change PERF he NOM life style.)
 Better translation: "他因收入减少而改变生活方式。" (他因收入減少而改變生活方式。) (lit. he because [of] income declines, CONJ change life style.)
 Overuse of abstract verbs. e.g.:
 "Audience responded very enthusiastically to the visiting professor."
 "听众对访问教授作出了十分热烈的反应。" (聽眾對訪問教授做出了十分熱烈的反應)
 (audience to visiting professor make PERF very enthusiastic response.)
 Better translation: "听众对访问教授反应十分热烈。" (聽眾對訪問教授反應十分熱烈) (lit. audience to visiting professor respond very enthusiastically.) 
 Overuse of "a/an" (一). e.g.:
 "He is a good man."
 "他是一个好人。" (他是一個好人)
 (he is one-CL good person.)
 Better translation: "他是好人。" (lit. he is good person.)
 Overuse of the subordinating particle "的" (NOM). In Chinese language, adjective words placed immediately ahead of noun words do not require '的'. e.g.
 'White duck', 'deep water'
 '白色的鸭', '深深的水'
 Better translation: '白鸭' ('白' is already used as a colour name, so '色' can be eliminated), '深水' (the second '深' is not necessary, unless it is used as emphasis, which would require '的' after the second '深')
 Overuse of nouns or gerunds when verb-based phrases are simpler. e.g.:
 做一個處理的動作 (performs a processing activity)
 Better translation: 處理一下/一次 (processes once) ('處理' is already a verb)
 'He is reading.'
 '他進行閱讀的動作。'
 Better translation: '他正在閱讀。'
 Overuse of the passive voice (被动句/被動句).
 In Chinese, it is also associated with negative connotations. e.g.:
 "He is called ..."
 "他被称为…"
 (he COVERB call (to-)be...)
 Better translation: "他叫…" (lit. he calls)
 In Chinese, it is more often to use active phrase except in journals where objectivity is expected. e.g.:
 'For the questionnaire portion, please help us to fill it.'
 '問卷的部份請幫我們做一個填寫。'
 Better translation: '請幫我們填寫問卷的部份。' (Please help us fill in the questionnaire portion.)
 Overuse of adpositions such as "关于" (about).
 Semantic overlap. 
 'Male adult'
 '雄性男人'
 Better translation: '男人' ('男' already implies '雄性' (male))
 Overuse of "性" (-ity, lit. property).
 Overuse of group suffix '們'.
 In Chinese, explicit group suffix is not used if number of members in a group is stated. e.g.:
 'Three oranges'
 '三個橙們'
 Better translation: '三個橙' (Three (units of)/individual oranges. The classifier '個' must be added between number and the base noun.)
 If number is not stated in second base noun, but if a number is already applied to first noun, and the first noun is used to describe the second noun, '們' is not used. e.g.:
 'Two boxes of oranges'
 '二盒橙們'
 Better translation: '二盒橙'
 Certain alternate group words can be used without altering meaning depending on context. e.g.:
 'Everyone'
 Proper translation: '各位', '諸位' (In both English and Chinese, the words apply to singular and plural audiences.)
 '諸', '等', '眾', '群' are also applicable to groups.

See also
 Chinglish

References

Chinese grammar